The Six Days of Charleroi was a short-lived six-day track cycling race held annually in Charleroi, Belgium.

It took place on a dismountable velodrome, especially installed for the event in the Charleroi Exhibition Centre. Three editions were organized from 1967 to 1969, of which Patrick Sercu and Ferdinand Bracke won two.

Winners

External links 

Cycle races in Belgium
Six-day races
Recurring sporting events established in 1967
Recurring sporting events disestablished in 1969
1967 establishments in Belgium
1969 disestablishments in Belgium
Defunct cycling races in Belgium

References